Na kometě (literally On the Comet) is a 1970 Czech film directed by Karel Zeman, based on Jules Verne's novel Off on a Comet.

The film is a combination of animated and live action film. Animation is based on illustrations for Verne's novels. The story is presented in grotesque way, especially conflicts between British and French soldiers. Zeman added a romantic plot that includes Hector Servadac and Angelica.

Plot
In a French colony of Northern Africa, Captain Hector Servadac works as a cartographer for the French army. He falls into the sea while mapping the area and is saved by the beautiful Angelica, a young woman on the run from Spanish captors. The Spaniards are helping the Arabian king, who is leading an uprising in the colony. While the French and Arabian army are preparing to battle, a comet touches Earth's surface and carries the territory away.

French, Spaniards and Arabians are trapped together on the comet, but are still intent on continuing to fight. Hector returns to his commander, who orders all non-French people arrested. This includes the Spaniards as well as Angelica's brothers, who, unaware of her escape, are trying to save her. Angelica herself is hidden away by shopkeepers in a town that was carried away with the soldiers. The Arabians, who lost their weapons during the comet's impact, are waiting for the opportunity to get armed. The colony is attacked by a group of dinosaurs, and the French general orders Hector to lead a counterattack. It is unsuccessful, and Hector has to run for his life.

He meets Angelica in the town, where she is helping shopkeepers pack their metal pots in a carriage. He tries to convince her to run away with him but the horses are scared by the noise of falling pots and run towards the dinosaurs. Hector tries to catch up with the carriage, but the dinosaurs run away when they hear the noise made by the pots. The French general, seeing the dinosaurs retreat, decides to replace his army's weapons with pots. The Arabians take advantage of this decision, stocking up on the weapons the French throw away. The Arabian army then attacks the French, but before they can defeat it, planet Mars appears in the sky. Both armies decide to stop the conflict, as they believe that the comet will hit the planet and that everyone will die in the impact. This prediction proves untrue as the comet misses Mars. Hector convinces them to keep the peace and start a new peaceful society on the comet.

Their happiness is interrupted by Angelica's brothers who, believing Hector is her kidnapper, ambush him. They kidnap Angelica and set off homeward, unaware that they have left Earth. The Spaniards offer their ship to save Angelica and Hector goes after her. During the sea voyage, the Spanish ship comes across what seems to be a coast. It is revealed to be a giant serpent. The Spaniards and Hector are shocked, but are able to scare it off with pots. They also come across an island full of prehistoric creatures, and witness life evolving from the sea. Hector eventually finds Angelica and they plan to get married. Earth appears in the sky during the wedding which leads everybody to return to their old conflicts. When the comet touches Earth, everybody starts fighting again. The French and Spaniards are defeated by Arabs, and Angelica is once again kidnapped by her brothers. Hector runs after them but falls to the sea. Hector wakes up on the coast, saved by his adjutant, who reveals that the adventure was all a dream.

Cast

 Magda Vášáryová as Angelika
 Emil Horváth as Lt. Servadac
 František Filipovský as Col. Picard
 Čestmír Řanda as Spanish consul
 Josef Větrovec as Sheikh
 Jiřina Jirásková as Ester
 Vladimír Menšík as Silberman
 Miloslav Holub as Hikmet
 Karel Effa as Cprl. Ben
 Josef Hlinomaz as Capt. Lacoste
 Jaroslav Mareš as Cprl. Lafitte
 Eduard Kohout as Murphy
 Zdena Bronislavská as Tavern dancer
 Steva Maršálek as Mahdi
 Karel Pavlík as Oliphant   
 Jaroslav Štercl as Sailor with keys
 Jiří Lír as Cannoneer Ali
 Miloš Nesvatba as Husein
 Jan Bor as Luigi
 Pavel Libovický as Antonio
 Jaroslav Klouda as Pepino

See also
Valley of the Dragons (1961)

References

External links
 

1970 films
Czechoslovak science fiction adventure films
1970s Czech-language films
Films directed by Karel Zeman
Films based on French novels
Films based on works by Jules Verne
Czech science fiction adventure films
1970s science fiction adventure films
Films about dinosaurs
Films with screenplays by Karel Zeman
Films with live action and animation
Comets in film